Ialoveni is a city in the Republic of Moldova situated  from Chișinău. The city is administrative center of the Ialoveni District.

History 
On 25 March 1977 the settlement was named to Kutuzov, and also its status was changed to urban-type settlement. In 1989, after Moldova gained suveranity, on citizens demand, the locality re-took its old name – Ialoveni. Since 7 December 1994 Ialoveni has status of city/town.

International relations

Twin towns – sister cities
Ialoveni is twinned with:

 Force, Italy
 Ineu, Romania
 Lesznowola, Poland
 Montefortino, Italy
 Pașcani, Romania
 Pocheon, South Korea
 Radnevo, Bulgaria
 Senec, Slovakia
 Tomești, Romania
 Topraisar, Romania

References

External links

Cities and towns in Moldova
Kishinyovsky Uyezd
Ialoveni District